Rubén Valtierra (born December 26, 1954) is a keyboardist best known for recording and touring with "Weird Al" Yankovic. The two met at the Dr. Demento 20th Anniversary special in October 1991, and shortly after Valtierra joined his band.

Biography
Valtierra began classical studies at the age of ten. After playing in his high school orchestra, he attended the University of California at Santa Cruz, and later was a member of the award-winning Cabrillo College Big Band.    Upon graduation from UCSC in 1978, Valtierra led the popular Santa Cruz jazz/funk fusion group, Rush Hour, until moving to Los Angeles where he began playing and touring with groups such as Santana, Aretha Franklin, Tom Jones, Natalie Cole, Tower of Power, Chick Corea, Elton John, and Red Hot Chili Peppers. Valtierra also toured with Glenn Hughes/Deep Purple in 1995 and Charlie Musselwhite in 1997.

Valtierra also writes and produces, and leads his band Valtierra Latin Orchestra (VLO).

Discography

With "Weird Al" Yankovic
Off the Deep End
Alapalooza
Bad Hair Day
Running with Scissors
Poodle Hat
Straight Outta Lynwood
Alpocalypse
Mandatory Fun

References

20th-century American keyboardists
"Weird Al" Yankovic
University of California, Santa Cruz alumni
Living people
Musicians from San Rafael, California
1954 births
21st-century American keyboardists